"Imma Be" is a song recorded by the American group the Black Eyed Peas for their fifth studio album The E.N.D. (2009). The song's title is a slang expression, meaning "I am going to be" or "I will be". Initially released as a promotional single, the song went on to receive a full release as the fourth single from The E.N.D. on January 12, 2010, by Interscope Records.

A commercial success, "Imma Be" became the third single from The E.N.D. to reach number-one on the US Billboard Hot 100. Critical reception to the song was generally mixed. The accompanying music video for the song was filmed back-to-back as a ten-minute video, titled "Imma Be Rocking That Body", with "Rock That Body". The song was part of the soundtrack of the film The Other Guys (2010) and was used in the bar scene, and appeared in the film The Hangover Part II (2011).

Critical reception
Critical response to the song was generally positive. Eric Henderson from Slant Magazine stated that in the song, "halfway through, the pulse gets an upgrade, the tempo hustles up to a strut, the rudimentary synth hits explode into a chunky-funky rush, and before you know it, will.i.am has transformed a deliberately lazy self-parody into a heated club-floor burner. He added: "The dialectic without conversation within "Imma Be" is replayed ad nauseam throughout the album's entire bloated running time". PopMatters gave the song a positive review: "Highlights of the album include 'Imma be', which despite the repetition of the title no less than 105 times...takes a really interesting path from hip-hop attitude to club hit to jazz romp that holds up well to repeated listens". Vibe Magazine said that "Imma Be is the 2008 version of 'My Humps'". Billboard said "The group sounds as unabashedly confident as ever here.....A brazen horn section and smooth keyboards cruise along until the song's sudden transition, when the beat switches from a snap music-meets-Neptunes stomp to a funk-house glide, meshing with a seemingly endless vocal loop of 'Imma be' to form a pounding, assertive club thumper. Given the success of its predecessors, 'Imma Be', while inherently gimmicky, should be sticking around for a long time".

Chart performance
Prior to The E.N.D.s release, "Imma Be" was released as a worldwide promotional single and peaked at number 50 in the United States, based on downloads alone. It was later released as the fourth single from the album in the U.S. and became the group's third number one hit on the Billboard Hot 100 for the week ending March 6, 2010 and halted the nine-week run of Kesha's "Tik Tok". It was the group's third number one from The E.N.D., following their first two number ones, "Boom Boom Pow" and "I Gotta Feeling", as well as their fourth consecutive top ten from the album. With the single reaching number one, the Black Eyed Peas became the first group or duo to place three number ones on the Hot 100 from one album since the Wilson Phillips's debut album, Wilson Phillips, in 1990–1991. This placed the Black Eyed Peas adjoined with Usher's 2004 Confessions album to have their singles from the same album spend the most weeks on top of the Billboard Hot 100, at 28 weeks, only beaten by Drake's Scorpion, (2018) whose singles spent 29 collective weeks at number one. "Imma Be" reached the top ten on the Canadian Hot 100 due to a significant increase in digital downloads following a performance of "Imma Be" at the 52nd Grammy Awards.

Music video

The video was filmed on January 13, 2010. The clip features Fergie wearing Louboutin designer footwear and a black metallic leotard and riding a BMW S1000RR motorcycle. Extras were dressed as robots and nomads (like apl.de.ap in "Meet Me Halfway"). It was shot on a desert road in Lancaster, California. Filming was interrupted by a sudden sandstorm, however, as the storm passed, filming resumed. The music video, directed by Rich Lee, was shot back to back with the video for "Rock That Body", the second song on The E.N.D. The two songs were mashed up into a medley, which is titled "Imma Be Rocking That Body". The medley length is 8:15 and the music video in total is 10:21. It premiered on Vevo and Dipdive on February 16, 2010. The videos were separated for music channels with the introduction and conclusion removed. The "Imma Be Rocking That Body" video begins with the Black Eyed Peas in the studio when will.i.am demonstrates a machine that recreates vocal recordings of singers and rappers from a set of typed lyrics and a series of vocal samples. After the other members protest against the device's use, Fergie walks out of the studio in frustration and rides off in a motorcycle only to get hit by a car. The "Imma Be" video then begins with Fergie, following her accident, waking up on a road in a desert where she notices everything stuck on a loop. She gets up and sings the first verse, trailed by an evil black giant robot. She arrives at a bar and finds will.i.am who is stuck on a loop of pouring his drink. She mutes his Beats which makes him stop. He notices that the robot who looped him is following them and they both hide. As the robot looks for them, they both escape in a hovercar. The robot chases them but it runs out of energy. They arrive at a scrapyard where they find apl.de.ap who is also stuck on a loop. will.i.am taps him and makes him stop. apl.de.ap brings a good white robot to life as they dig through the scrap and find Taboo whose bottom half of his body is missing. will.i.am and apl.de.ap carry him as they find a pair of legs walking around the scrapyard and they quickly fix him. As apl.de.ap raps his verse, the robots dance in the background and they disappear, leaving the evil robot confused.

Track listing
 Digital Download E.P.

 UK & German CD Single

Charts

Weekly charts

Monthly charts

Year-end charts

Certifications

Release history

See also 
 List of Billboard Hot 100 number ones of 2010
 List of Billboard Hot Dance Club Songs number ones of 2010

References

2009 singles
Billboard Hot 100 number-one singles
Song recordings produced by will.i.am
Songs written by will.i.am
Black Eyed Peas songs
Interscope Records singles
Songs written by Keith Harris (record producer)
Song recordings produced by Keith Harris (record producer)
2009 songs
Music videos directed by Rich Lee